Strathdale is a suburb of the regional city of Bendigo in north central Victoria, Australia,  east of the Bendigo city centre. Victory Christian College is located in Strathdale.

References

External links

Bendigo